Claudia Lössl (born 2 October 1966) is a German actress best known for her work in Boo, Zino & the Snurks and for dubbing the voices of actresses such as Penélope Cruz, Naomi Watts and Renée Zellweger in German releases of English-language films.

Life and career 
In Hamburg, Lössl received her education as an actor. In 1987, she was cast in Married... with Children (1987–1997), for which she provided the German voiceover for actress Christina Applegate as Kelly Bundy for ten years. She also synchronizes voices in animated films.

Dubbing roles

Movies 
For actress Penélope Cruz:
1997: Live Flesh as Isabel Plaza Caballero
1999: All About My Mother as Maria
2008: Elegy as Consuela Castillo
2009: Broken Embraces as Lena
2011: Pirates of the Caribbean – Foreign Tides as Angelica
2013: The Counselor as Laura
2013: I'm So Excited as Jessica
2014: Twice Born as Gemma
2016: Zoolander 2 as Valentina
2017: Murder on the Orient Express as Pilar Estravados

For actress Naomi Watts:
2005: King Kong as Ann Darrow
2007: Eastern Promises as Anna
2009: The International as Eleanor Whitman
2009: Mother and Child as Elizabeth
2010: Fair Game as Valerie Plame
2011: Dream House as Ann Patterson
2011: J. Edgar as Helen Gandy
2013: Diana as Princess Diana
2014: While We're Young as Cornelia
2015: Demolition as Karen Moreno
2016: Shut In as Mary Portman

Others 

1993: Marisa Tomei in Untamed Heart as Caroline
1994: Renée Zellweger in Love and a .45 as Starlene Cheatham
1996: Jennifer Jason Leigh in Bastard Out of Carolina as Anney Boatwright
1997: Drew Barrymore in Wishful Thinking as Lena
1998: Drew Barrymore in The Wedding Singer as Julia Sullivan
1998: Emmanuelle Seigner in RPM as Michelle Claire
1998: Teri Polo in A Father for Brittany as Kim Lussier
1999: Alicia Silverstone in Blast from the Past as Eve Rustikoff
2000: Christina Applegate in The Brutal Truth as Emily
2000: Lindsay Sloane in Bring It On as Big Red
2001: Kristy Swanson in Soul Assassin as Tessa Jansen
2001: Teri Polo in The Unsaid as Barbara Lonigan
2002: Renée Zellweger in Chicago as Roxanne Hart
2002: Jennifer Jason Leigh in Hey Arnold!: The Movie as Bridget
2002: Lucy Liu in Ballistic: Ecks vs. Sever as Agent Sever
2002: Lucy Liu in Cypher as Rita Foster
2002: Rebecca Romijn in Rollerball as Aurora
2002: Roselyn Sánchez in Boat Trip as Gabriella
2003: Kristy Swanson in Silence as Dr. Julia Craig
2003: Missi Pyle in Bringing Down the House as Ashley
2003: Elizabeth Perkins in Finding Nemo as Cora (Coral)
2004: Dina Spybey in The Haunted Mansion as Emma
2005: Christina Applegate in Suzanne's Diary for Nicholas as Dr. Suzanne Bedford
2005: Julie Benz in 8mm 2 as Lynn
2005: Marisa Tomei in Factotum as Laura
2005: Joy Bryant in London as Mallory
2005: Renée Zellweger in Cinderella Man as Mae Braddock
2005: Mary McCormack in Madison as Bonnie McCormick
2005: Victoria Pratt in Tatort as Tara Jeffries
2005: Polly Shannon in Stone Cold as Abby Taylor
2005: Jane Sibbett in Buffalo Dreams as Blaine Townsend
2006: Mariya Poroshina in Day Watch as Svetlana
2006: Rebecca Romijn in Man About Town as Nina Giamoro
2006: Polly Shannon in Jesse Stone: Night Passage as Abby Taylor
2007: Radha Mitchell in Rogue as Kate Ryan
2008: Julie Benz in Punisher: War Zone as Angela
2008: Sarah Clarke in Twilight as Renée Dwyer
2009: Radha Mitchell in Thick as Thieves as Alex
2010: Sarah Clarke in The Twilight Saga: Eclipse as Renée Dwyer
2010: Kristen Wiig in MacGruber as Vicki St. Elmo
2011: Julie Benz in Ricochet as Elise Laird
2011: Brooke Shields in Chalet Girl as Caroline
2012: Kristen Wiig in Girl Most Likely as Imogene Duncan
2013: Connie Britton in Angels Sing as Susan Walker
2014: Marisa Tomei in The Rewrite as Holly Carpenter
2014: Sarah Paulson in 12 Years a Slave as Mistress Epps
2015: Christina Applegate in Vacation as Debbie Griswold
2015: Kristen Wiig in Hateship, Loveship as Johanna Parry

Acting filmography 
 1989: Forsthaus Falkenau (TV series, 8 episodes)
 1992:  (TV series, 1 episode)
 1994–1995: Ein Fall für zwei (TV series, 2 episodes)
 1995: Dr. Stefan Frank – Der Arzt, dem die Frauen vertrauen (TV series, episode "Dr. Frank und die Killerbakterien")
 1996: Großstadtrevier (TV series, episode "Gute Nachbarschaft")
 2002: Tatort:  (TV film)
 2002: Finanzamt Mitte – Helden im Amt (TV series, 8 episodes)
 2003: Der Ermittler (TV series, episode "Tödliches Wiedersehen")
 2006: Das total verrückte Wunderauto (TV film)
 2007: Die Copiloten (TV film)
 2007: Die Lawine (TV film)
 2008: Die Rosenheim-Cops (TV series, episode "Der Tod coacht mit")
 2009: Tatort:  (TV film)

References

External links 
 

1966 births
Living people
Actresses from Munich
German film actresses
German television actresses
German voice actresses